John Copcutt Mansion, also known as Saint Casimir's Rectory, is a historic home located at Yonkers, Westchester County, New York. It was built in 1854 and is cruciform in plan, two and one half stories high in an elaborate Italianate style.  It is five bays wide, divided into three sections by a central, projecting three story tower.  It was acquired by St. Casimir Roman Catholic Parish in Yonkers in 1900 and used as a convent and, after 1955, a rectory.  John Copcutt (1805-1895) was a prominent industrialist and contributed significantly to the development of Yonkers.  His daughter married Dr. Charles Leale (1842-1932) in the house.

It was added to the National Register of Historic Places in 1985.

For more information on the life of John Copcutt see https://www.findagrave.com/memorial/17652600/john-benham-copcutt

References

Houses on the National Register of Historic Places in New York (state)
Italianate architecture in New York (state)
Houses completed in 1854
Buildings and structures in Yonkers, New York
Houses in Westchester County, New York
National Register of Historic Places in Yonkers, New York